Rupert Pennycuick (11 April 1893 – 17 January 1963) was an Australian cricketer. He played three first-class matches for Tasmania between 1911 and 1913.

See also
 List of Tasmanian representative cricketers

References

External links
 

1893 births
1963 deaths
Australian cricketers
Tasmania cricketers
Cricketers from Tasmania